Strondefjell is a mountain in the municipality of Bykle in Agder county, Norway. The mountain is the 23rd highest in the whole county. The mountain sits in the Setesdalsheiene mountains on the northern shore of the lake Botsvatn, about  straight west of the village of Bykle.

See also
List of mountains of Norway

References

Bykle
Mountains of Agder